A Verlet list (named after Loup Verlet) is a data structure in molecular dynamics simulations to efficiently maintain a list of all particles within a given cut-off distance of each other.

This method may easily be applied to Monte Carlo simulations. For short-range interactions, a cut-off radius is typically used, beyond which particle interactions are considered "close enough" to zero to be safely ignored. For each particle, a Verlet list is constructed that lists all other particles within the potential cut-off distance, plus some extra distance so that the list may be used for several consecutive Monte Carlo "sweeps" (set of Monte Carlo steps or moves) before being updated. By optimizing our choice of  it can be shown that Verlet lists allow converting the  problem of Monte Carlo sweeps to an  problem.

Using cell lists to identify the nearest neighbors in  further reduces the computational cost.

See also
Verlet integration
Fast multipole method
Molecular mechanics
Software for molecular mechanics modeling

References

External links
Constructing a Neighbour List — from Introduction to Atomistic Simulations course at the University of Helsinki.

Molecular dynamics
Computational chemistry